The CAF Women's Olympic Qualifying Tournament is a football competition which acts as qualification to the Summer Olympics women's football tournament for the Confederation of African Football (CAF).

Results

External links 
Olympic Games - Women's Football Tournament and qualifications - rsssf.com

 
Olympic